Mindfulness is the practice of purposely bringing one's attention to experiences occurring in the present moment without judgment.

Mindfulness may also refer to:

 Mindfulness (book), a 1989 book by Ellen Langer
 Mindfulness or Sati, a spiritual faculty that forms an essential part of Buddhist practice
 Mindfulness (journal), an academic journal on psychology

See also